William John Harlin Moore (10 September 1866 - 14 October 1933) was a member of the Queensland Legislative Assembly.

Early life
Moore was born at Boort Cottage, Brighton, Victoria, the son of John Moore and his wife Charlotte (née Harlin). He was educated at Ipswich State and Boys' Grammar Schools and in Queensland and Hurstville College in New South Wales. He was a stock buyer for the Queensland Mercantile Company in 1885 and then took up pastoral pursuits.

He married Lillian Mary O'Hara. Moore died in October 1933 and his funeral moved from the funeral parlour of Alex Gow at Petrie Bight to the Toowong Cemetery.

Public life
Moore won the seat of Murilla in the Queensland Legislative Assembly at the by-election in 1898 to replace Hugh Nelson who had been appointed to the Legislative Council. He held the seat until 1904 when he did not stand.

He was returned as member again however at the 1907 state election and retired two years later.

References

Members of the Queensland Legislative Assembly
1866 births
1933 deaths
Burials at Toowong Cemetery
People from Brighton, Victoria
Australian pastoralists
20th-century Australian politicians